Captain Sir Elias Wynne Cemlyn-Jones  (16 May 1888 – 6 June 1966), known as Wynne Cemlyn-Jones, was a Welsh Liberal Party politician.

Background
He was the son of Anglesey farmer John Cemlyn-Jones of Brynbella, Penmaenmawr. He was educated at Shrewsbury School. In 1914, he married Muriel Gwendolin Owen. They had two sons and two daughters. His wife died in 1930.

Professional career
In 1912, he became Private Secretary to Anglesey's Liberal MP Sir Ellis Griffith, when he was appointed Under-Secretary of State for the Home Department. He supported Griffith in his task of steering the Welsh Disestablishment Bill through the House of Commons. He was admitted to the Middle Temple on 16 July 1913. In 1914, after the bill was passed and war broke out, he signed up to serve in the Royal Welch Fusiliers. He was Called to the Bar at Middle Temple on 17 November 1919 and was appointed a Member of the Order of the British Empire in the 1919 New Year Honours.

Political career
His first introduction to politics had come from working for his local Liberal MP, Sir Ellis Griffith. He got involved in civic affairs on Anglesey. In 1919 he was elected to Anglesey County Council. He served on this body as a Councillor, until he was appointed to it as an Alderman in 1928. He was Liberal candidate for the Unionist seat of South Croydon at the 1923 General Election. It was not a promising seat for the Liberals, whose candidate had polled 25.2% in 1922, finishing third. He was unable to advance the Liberal position;

He did not contest the 1924 General Election, when the South Croydon seat became a 2-way contest between Unionist and Labour. He became Chairman of Anglesey County Council. He was Liberal candidate for the Brecon & Radnor division at the 1929 General Election. This was a far better prospect as the Liberals had held the seat up until the 1924 General Election when they narrowly lost the seat to the Unionists in a close three-way battle, with Labour third. He managed to increase the Liberal share of the vote, but Labour came through to take the seat from third place;

He did not stand for parliament again. He was Chairman of the Selection Committee of Anglesey County Council. He was vice-president of County Councils Association. He was knighted in the 1941 New Year Honours, for public services in Anglesey.

He died at Llandudno Hospital in Wales, age 79.

References

1888 births
1966 deaths
Liberal Party (UK) parliamentary candidates
People educated at Shrewsbury School
British Army personnel of World War I
Members of the Order of the British Empire
Members of the Middle Temple
Liberal Party (UK) councillors
Councillors in Wales
Royal Welch Fusiliers soldiers